Eleocharis is a virtually cosmopolitan genus of 250 or more species of flowering plants in the sedge family, Cyperaceae. The name is derived from the Greek words ἕλειος (heleios), meaning "marsh dweller," and χάρις (charis), meaning "grace." Members of the genus are known commonly as spikerushes or spikesedges. The genus has a geographically cosmopolitan distribution, with centers of diversity in the Amazon Rainforest and adjacent eastern slopes of the South American Andes, northern Australia, eastern North America, California, Southern Africa, and subtropical Asia. The vast majority of Eleocharis species grow in aquatic or mesic habitats from sea level to higher than 5,000 meters in elevation (in the tropical Andes).

The genus itself is relatively easy to recognize; all Eleocharis species have photosynthetic stems but no green leaves (the leaves have been reduced to sheaths surrounding the base of the stems). Many species are robust, rhizomatously-spreading plants of lowland tropical wetlands, while many others are small caespitose annual or perennial herbs growing near streams, and still others are intermediate. There are also a number of species that are obligate aquatic species, which usually have submerged, branching stems and often exhibit interesting photosynthetic adaptations, such as the ability to switch between C3 and C4 carbon fixation in response to different environmental stimuli. In all Eleocharis species, the flowers are borne on unbranched terminal spikelets at the apices of stems.

In spite of the diversity of the genus itself, taxonomic characters useful for delimiting species within it are few, and many species are very difficult to tell apart. Many currently recognized species with very wide geographic ranges are highly polymorphic. Some of these species probably contain multiple independently evolving lineages.  Because of their difficult nature, it is suggested that many botanists avoid collecting these plants and so many species are under-represented in the botanical record.

One of the best known species is the Chinese water chestnut, Eleocharis dulcis. These plants bear tubers on their rhizomes which may be peeled and eaten raw or boiled. In Australia, magpie geese rely almost exclusively on these tubers for sustenance for a significant portion of the year.

Selected species
Eleocharis acicularis (L.) Roem. & Schult. – needle spikerush; dwarf hairgrass
Eleocharis acuta R.Br.
Eleocharis acutangula (Roxb.) Schult.
Eleocharis afflata Steud.
Eleocharis atropurpurea (Retz.) J.Presl & C.Presl – purple spikerush
Eleocharis baldwinii (Torr.) Chapm.
Eleocharis bella (Piper) Svenson – beautiful spikerush
Eleocharis bifida S.G. Smith glade spikerush
Eleocharis bolanderi A.Gray – Bolander's spikerush
Eleocharis brassii S.T.Blake	
Eleocharis brittonii Svenson ex Small
Eleocharis caespitosissima Baker
Eleocharis cellulosa Torr. – coastal spikerush, Gulf Coast spikerush
Eleocharis compressa Sull. – flatstem spikerush
Eleocharis confervoides (Poir.) Steud.
Eleocharis congesta D.Don
Eleocharis cylindrostachys Boeckler
Eleocharis dietrichiana Boeckler
Eleocharis dulcis (Burm.f.) Trin. ex Hensch. – Chinese water chestnut
Eleocharis elegans (Kunth) Roem. & Schult.
Eleocharis equisetoides (Elliott) Torr.
Eleocharis erythropoda Steud. – Red-stemmed spikerush
Eleocharis filiculmis Kunth
Eleocharis geniculata (L.) Roem. & Schult. – Canada spikesedge
Eleocharis gracilis R.Br.	
Eleocharis halophila Fernald & Brackett – saltmarsh spikerush
Eleocharis jacobsiana K.L.Wilson
Eleocharis keigheryi K.L.Wilson
Eleocharis kuroguwai Ohwi
Eleocharis macrostachya Britton – pale spikerush
Eleocharis montana (Kunth) Roem. & Schult.
Eleocharis montevidensis Kunth – sand spikerush
Eleocharis mutata (L.) Roem. & Schult. – scallion grass
Eleocharis nitida Fernald – neat spikerush
Eleocharis nodulosa Schult.
Eleocharis obtusa (Willd.) Schult. – blunt spikerush
Eleocharis ochrostachys Steud.	
Eleocharis pachycarpa Desv. – black sand spikerush
Eleocharis pachystyla (C.Wright) C.B.Clarke – false junco
Eleocharis pallens S.T.Blake – pale spikerush	
Eleocharis palustris (L.) Roem. & Schult. – common spikerush
Eleocharis papillosa Latz	
Eleocharis parishii Britton – Parish's spikerush
Eleocharis parvula (Roem. & Schult.) Link ex Bluff et al. – dwarf spikerush, hairgrass
Eleocharis pellucida J.Presl & C.Presl
Eleocharis philippinensis Svenson
Eleocharis plana S.T.Blake
Eleocharis pusilla R.Br.	
Eleocharis quadrangulata (Michx.) Roem. – squarestem spikerush
Eleocharis quinqueflora (Hartmann) O.Schwarz – fewflower spikerush
Eleocharis radicans (A.Dietr.) Kunth – rooted spikerush
Eleocharis rivalis K.L.Wilson	
Eleocharis rostellata (Torr.) Torr. – beaked spikerush
Eleocharis sanguinolenta K.L.Wilson	
Eleocharis sellowiana Kunth
Eleocharis sphacelata R.Br. – tall spikerush
Eleocharis spiralis (Rottb.) Schult.
Eleocharis sundaica J.Kern 	
Eleocharis tenuis (Willd.) Schult. – slender spikerush
Eleocharis torticulmis S.G.Sm. – twist-stem spikerush
Eleocharis tortilis (Link) Schult. – twisted spikerush
Eleocharis triquetra K.L.Wilson 
Eleocharis tuberculosa  (Michx.) Roem. & Schult. 
Eleocharis uniglumis (Link) (Link) Schult., 1824
Eleocharis vivipara Link – umbrella hairgrass

References

External links

USDA Plants Profile: North American Species
eFloras Profile
Baksh & Richards (2006) An architectural model for Eleocharis: morphology and development of Eleocharis cellulosa (Cyperaceae). Am J Botany 93:707-15.
Hairgrass 
Botany.com 
Rataj, Karel. 1977. Aquarium plants; hair grass. TFH 12/77.

 
Cyperaceae genera
Aquatic plants
Freshwater plants